The British Rail Class 122 diesel mechanical multiple units were built by Gloucester RC&W in 1958.  Twenty single-car, double-ended driving motor vehicles, nicknamed "Bubble Cars", were built, numbered 55000–55019. These were supplemented by nine single-ended trailer vehicles, numbered 56291–56299 (some of which were later renumbered into the 54291–54299 block).

Construction

Operation 
The Class 122s were built mainly for use on the London Midland Region of British Railways, although some were also used in Scotland. They were used on a variety of lightly used lines, many of which were closed during the Beeching Axe in the 1960s including the ex-LSWR lines in West Devon and North Cornwall. Routes served included the Stourbridge Town and St Albans Abbey branch lines, as well as local services between Dundee and Arbroath. (The similar Pressed Steel Company built Class 121 single units were also used on the Western Region).

During the 1990s, refurbished Class 122 units were used on the Cornish branches between Liskeard and Looe and St Erth and St Ives.

Parcels conversion 
In 1968, three cars (55013–55015) were converted for use on the Scottish Region to carry parcels traffic and were reclassified Class 131, though the vehicles themselves were not renumbered. The converted vehicles were given the TOPS classification DXV.

Usage after passenger service 
Upon privatisation of Britain's railways, the Class 122 fleet has been withdrawn from normal service. However several units were operated by EWS and Network Rail (previously Railtrack) in departmental service, reclassified as Class 960.

Preservation 
"Bubble Cars" have proved popular for preservation on heritage railways.

Models 
Dapol has released models of the class 122 railcar in both O gauge and OO gauge in a variety of liveries.

References

Sources

External links 

Entry at the Railcar Association for class 122

122
Gloucester multiple units
Train-related introductions in 1958